The Central American Volcanic Arc (often abbreviated to CAVA) is a chain of volcanoes which extends parallel to the Pacific coastline of the Central American Isthmus, from Mexico to Panama. This volcanic arc, which has a length of 1,100 kilometers (680 mi) is formed by an active subduction zone, with the Cocos Plate subducting underneath the Caribbean Plate. The region has been volcanically and geologically active for at least the past several million years. Numerous volcanoes are spread throughout various Central American countries; many have been active in the geologic past, some more so than others.

Tectonic history 
The Cocos tectonic plate is along the western edge of Central America. The latter is along the western edge of the Caribbean tectonic plate and can be split into two distinct regimes. These regimes are demarcated roughly by the Costa Rican-Nicaraguan border and can be differentiated by the different tectonic histories of each respective area. The southern portion is part of a magmatic arc, while the northern one is associated with several active margins. Different types of faults also exist within each regime and further serve to differentiate the northern and southern regions’ geologic and tectonic histories from one another.

This Caribbean-Cocos tectonic plate interaction can further explain the volcanism and geologic history of the region. While previous literature has shown a wide range of ages for the subduction of the Cocos plate, it is now believed that this subduction began between two million years ago and three million years ago (between 2 Ma and 3 Ma), though the area has been geologically active since at least 12 Ma, as evidenced by plate and plate boundary movements, as well as scarp subduction in the area. A gap in volcanism in Central America between 12 Ma and 5 Ma is understood to have occurred as well.

Furthermore, the subduction of the Cocos tectonic plate itself is not thought to be what caused some of the changes in volcanism associated with the Central American Volcanic Arc; while the subduction of the Cocos Ridge is a continual event that has influenced volcanism in Central America, the subduction of the Coiba Ridge—a microplate in the region-- is thought to be the triggering event that instigated changes in volcanic activity in the geologic past. In short, the interaction of numerous tectonic plates—namely the Cocos, Caribbean, North American, and Coiba plates—over the past several million years has helped facilitate the continual existence of the Central American Volcanic Arc, influencing the tectonic and broad geologic history of the area.

Contemporary regional overview 
The Central American Volcanic Arc consists of hundreds of volcanic formations, including stratovolcanoes, composite volcanos, calderas, and lava domes. From a depositional standpoint, ash falls, ash flows, and deposits of tephra are prevalent throughout the region. Carbon and argon isotope dating has been used to date these deposits to the Quaternary, and it is suspected that several of these volcanos have been sporadically active for much of the past 200,000 years. 

Some volcanos in the area have even produced large explosive eruptions in the recent past, including the October 25, 1902, eruption of the Santa Maria volcano in Guatemala. This Plinian eruption spewed upwards of twenty cubic kilometers of ash almost thirty kilometers into the sky. Much of this ash was fine-grained, averaging less than 2 millimeters in size.

Similarly, Cerro Negro, a 250-meter-tall volcano in northwest Nicaragua, erupted in 1971, 1992, and 1995. The two latter eruptions, occurring in the 1990’s, had similar magmatic compositions to one another, both broadly basaltic. However, as the water and carbon dioxide contents of each eruption were different—with the earlier eruption having higher levels of carbon dioxide and water vapor, and the later eruption degassing many of its volatiles-- markedly different styles of eruption occurred, with the 1992 eruption of Cerro Negro much more explosive than its 1995 counterpart.

Other volcanos in Central America include the Salvadorian Santa Ana, Izalco, and San Salvador volcanoes, the Nicaraguan Masaya volcano, and the Costa Rican Miravalles, Irazú, and Poás volcanoes. Many remain sporadically active to this day, and likely will continue to be active into the future, as geologic and tectonic processes continue to shape the region.

Notes

References

 Abratis, M., 1998. Geochemical variations in magmatic rocks from southern Costa Rica as a consequence of Cocos Ridge subduction and uplift of the Cordillera de Talamanca. PhD thesis, Universitat zu Gottingen, p. 134.
 Álvarez-Gómez, J., Meijer, P., Martínez-Díaz, J. and Capote, R., 2008. Constraints from finite element modeling on the active tectonics of northern Central America and the Middle America Trench. Tectonics, 27(1)
 Collins, L.S., Coates, A.G., Jackson, J.B.C., Obando, J.A., 1995. Timing and rates of emergence of the Limon and Bocas del Toro basins: Caribbean effects of Cocos Ridge subduction? In: Mann, P. (Ed.), Geologic and Tectonic Development of the Caribbean Plate Boundary in Southern Central America. Spec. Pap.-Geol. Soc. Am. 295, pp. 263– 289.
 deBoer, J.Z., Drummond, M.S., Bordelon, M.J., Defant, M.J., Bellon, H., Maury, R.C., 1995. Cenozoic magmatic phases of the Costa Rican island arc (Cordillera de Talamanca). In: Mann, P. (Ed.), Geologic and Tectonic Development of the Caribbean Plate Boundary in Southern Central America. Spec. Pap.-Geol. Soc. Am. 295, pp. 35– 55. 
 Grafe, K., 1998. Exhumation and thermal evolution of the Cordillera de Talamanca (Costa Rica): constraints from fission track analysis, 40Ar – 39Ar and 87Rb– 87Sr chronology. PhD thesis, Universitat Tubingen, p. 113.
 Lonsdale, P., Klitgord, K.D., 1978. Structure and tectonic history of the eastern Panama Basin. Geol. Soc. Amer. Bull. 89, 981–999.
 MacMillan, I., Gans, P. and Alvarado, G., 2004. Middle Miocene to present plate tectonic history of the southern Central American Volcanic Arc. Tectonophysics, 392(1-4), pp.325-348.
 Melián, G. et al., 2005. Subduction process and diffuse CO2 degassing rates along Central America volcanic arc, Geophysical Research Abstracts, Vol. 7, 09598, 2005
 Morell, K., Kirby, E., Fisher, D. and van Soest, M., 2012. Geomorphic and exhumational response of the Central American Volcanic Arc to Cocos Ridge subduction. Journal of Geophysical Research: Solid Earth, 117(B4)
 Roggensack, K., Hervig, R., McKnight, S. and Williams, S., 1997. Explosive Basaltic Volcanism from Cerro Negro Volcano: Influence of Volatiles on Eruptive Style. Science, 277(5332), pp.1639-1642.
 Rose, W., Conway, F., Pullinger, C., Deino, A. and McIntosh, W., 1999. An improved age framework for late Quaternary silicic eruptions in northern Central America. Bulletin of Volcanology, 61(1-2), pp.106-120.
 Whattam, S. and Stern, R., 2015. Arc magmatic evolution and the construction of continental crust at the Central American Volcanic Arc system. International Geology Review, 58(6), pp.653-686.
 Williams, S. and Self, S., 1983. The October 1902 plinian eruption of Santa Maria volcano, Guatemala. Journal of Volcanology and Geothermal Research, 16(1-2), pp.33-56.

 
Volcanoes of Guatemala
Volcanoes of El Salvador
Volcanoes of Honduras
Volcanoes of Nicaragua
Volcanoes of Costa Rica
Volcanoes of Panama
Regions of Central America
Volcanic arcs